Catocala nymphaea is a species of moth of the family Erebidae. It was described by Eugenius Johann Christoph Esper in 1787. It is found in southern France, Austria, Albania, Portugal, Croatia, Italy, Greece, Corsica, Sicily, Crete, North Africa, Anatolia, Afghanistan and Kashmir.

Adults are on wing from July to August depending on the location.

The larvae feed on Quercus ilex.

Subspecies
Catocala nymphaea nymphaea
Catocala nymphaea kabuli (O. Bang-Haas, 1927) (Afghanistan)
Catocala nymphaea kashmirica (Warren, 1913) (Kashmir)
Catocala nymphaea parigilensis (Kardakoff, 1937)

References

External links

www.lepiforum.de
www.schmetterlinge-deutschlands.de

nymphaea
Moths described in 1787
Moths of Europe
Moths of Africa
Moths of Asia
Taxa named by Eugenius Johann Christoph Esper